Seiryu, Seiryū, or Seiryuu may refer to:
 Azure Dragon, a Chinese constellation symbol
 Seiryu (YuYu Hakusho), a character in YuYu Hakusho anime
 Seiryū (Fushigi Yūgi), a character in Fushigi Yūgi anime
 Seiryu, a cultivar of the Japanese maple
 Seiryū Inoue (1931–1988), Japanese photographer
 Seiryu stone, a kind of stone popular in aquariums, especially for aquascaping
Seiryuu, the guardian of the East Gate of The Imperial Palace in Accel World
 JS Seiryū (SS-509), a Japanese Sōryū-class submarine

Japanese masculine given names